National Route 325 is a national highway of Japan connecting Kurume, Fukuoka, and Takachiho, Miyazaki, in Japan, with a total length of 138.5 km (86.06 mi).

History
During the 2016 Kumamoto earthquakes, the Great Aso Bridge along National Route 325 was destroyed by a landslide that was triggered by the main shock on 16 April. A college student from Aso perished in the bridge collapse.

References

National highways in Japan
Roads in Fukuoka Prefecture
Roads in Kumamoto Prefecture
Roads in Miyazaki Prefecture